Simon Milton may refer to:
Simon Milton (politician) (1961–2011)
Simon Milton (footballer) (born 1963)